The Autódromo Internacional Miguel E. Abed is a racing track located in the town of Amozoc,  east of the city of Puebla in the Mexican state of the same name. The track has a capacity for 42,500 people.

History

It was opened in 1985 and considered to be one of Mexico's premier racing facilities. It features a road course and a  oval. The track held three World Touring Car Championship events in 2005, 2006 and 2008.

The FIA WTCC Race of Mexico  was a round of the World Touring Car Championship, held at the Autódromo Miguel E. Abed near the city of Puebla in Mexico.

The race was first run in the 2005 season, the first season of the revived series. This year, the race was almost cancelled because circuit was not ready to hold a competition. It was run every year between 2005 and 2009 except in the 2007 season, when the planned event was cancelled due to problems with the Puebla circuit, although these problems were addressed for 2008. The events were run in June 2005, July 2006, April 2008 and March 2009 respectively. The 2010 running was cancelled due to security and budget fears in the region.

The annual 24 Hours of Mexico race is held at the track since 2006.

The circuit facilities are the most important of the country. It opens to every kind of events including: Test Driving, Driving Experiences, Track Days, 0 to 60 series, Helicopter Experience, Corporate Events, Driving School and Go-Kart circuit.

Layouts

The track has 18 possible layouts, and several has been used for different events. WTCC used one configuration in 2005, and other in 2006, 2008, and 2009. Then NASCAR Corona Series, currently NASCAR PEAK Mexico Series has used the oval in 12 races and other configuration one time. LATAM Challenge Series has used several layouts for this circuit.

Layout configurations

The oval track

The main event in this track is the Puebla 240, a race of the NASCAR PEAK Mexico Series. For the 2018 season, Puebla is on the discussion for a possible IndyCar Series race.

The touring car circuit

Autódromo Internacional Miguel E. Abed is based on an American style oval with long banked turns and then a twisty, technical infield which is similar to Autódromo Internacional de Curitiba with an extremely rough surface. It has no camber worth noticing on the infield part and elevation change. There is a compromise to the setup of the touring car on the touring car circuit whether it goes fast on the infield (requires more downforce) or goes fast on the oval part (requires more speed). Touring car winning on this circuit requires smart driving as much as sheer speed, tyre wear control (because of the rough surface) and strategy.

Formula E circuit

On 22 April 2021, it was announced that Autódromo Miguel E. Abed would host a Formula E race in Mexico instead of Autódromo Hermanos Rodríguez, since it is still being used as a field hospital due to the COVID-19 pandemic in Mexico. The event would be called as Puebla ePrix and it would be held on the dates of 19–20 June 2021.

On 14 June 2021, the Formula E circuit layout was revealed, in which the layout was very similar to the WTCC layout except following a tighter hairpin after T3 and rejoining the WTCC layout at T6 within an infield loop; and also the layout included attack mode activation zone as the ‘joker lap’ alternate route different than other Formula E circuits.

Lap records

The official race lap records at the Autódromo Miguel E. Abed are listed as:

Events

 Current

 July: NASCAR Mexico Series, NASCAR Mikel's Truck Series
 October: NASCAR Mexico Series, NASCAR Mikel's Truck Series, Campeonato Mexicano de Súper Turismos Gran Premio Diego Duez presentado por Mothers, NACAM Formula 4 Championship, Gran Turismo Mexico

 Former

 Formula E Puebla ePrix (2021)
 Fórmula Panam (2005–2006, 2013, 2015–2018)
 LATAM Challenge Series (2008–2013)
 Mexican Formula Three Championship (1990–1995)
 World Touring Car Championship FIA WTCC Race of Mexico (2005–2006, 2008–2009)

Fatalities

The car was virtually destroyed on impact. He was transported to a local hospital by helicopter, where he was pronounced dead. He was declared the winner of the race since he was leading the race at the last completed lap before the accident occurred, beating Goeters by 0.044 seconds. Pardo, driving for Motorcraft team, had started the race from the last row.

References

External links
Autodromo Miguel E. Abed race results at Racing-Reference

Motorsport venues in Mexico
NASCAR tracks
Sports venues in Puebla
World Touring Car Championship circuits
Puebla